The mixed doubles tennis tournament at the 2014 South American Games in Santiago was held from 12 to 15 March on the clay courts of the Estadio Nacional Julio Martínez Prádanos in Ñuñoa.

Tie-breaks were used for the first two sets of each match, which was the best of three sets. If the score was tied at one set all, a 'super tie-break' (the first pairing to win at least 10 points by a margin of two points) would be used.

Venezuelans Adriana Pérez and David Souto defeated Chileans Camila Silva and Nicolás Jarry 7–5, 7–5 in the final to claim the second gold medal for Venezuela in the tennis competition.

Calendar
Matches took place between 12 and 15 March.

Seeds

Results

Draw

References
Mixed Doubles Draw

Tennis at the 2014 South American Games